Svalinn is a legendary shield in Nordic mythology which stands in front of Sun, protecting the world from her heat. It has been suggested to be part of a continuous tradition of solar imagery dating back to the Nordic Bronze Age.

Etymology

Attestations

Grímnismál
In Grímnismál, Odin gives the role of Svalinn as part of his description of the cosmology:

Nafnaþulur
In the Nafnaþulur section of the Prose Edda, Snorri Sturluson records Svalinn in a list of shields:

Sigrdrífumál
In Sigrdrífumál, runes are described as being carved on a shield, identified with Svalinn, along with the horses that draw Sun's chariot.

Interpretation and symbolism

The association between the sun and shields is noted both in Þórsdrápa, in which the sun is described as 'the splendid sky-shield', and in Skáldskaparmál, in which a kenning for 'shield' is the "sun of the ship". This relationship between ships, shields and the sun has been suggested to originate in the Nordic Bronze Age, in which all three form part of the sun myth. Ritual shields dating to the Bronze Age have also been discovered in Scandinavia which have been noted by scholars to resemble the sun and were possibly used to represent it in a religious context. 

In the Nordic Bronze Age, the sun could be depicted as a wheel cross or a disc, as with the Trundholm sun chariot. It has been argued that the disc later ceased to be seen as a representation of the sun god herself and instead as it appears in the sky, as a round shield. By this theory, the role of the shield in preventing the world from overheating came later to explain its presence.

See also
 Hou Yi—archer in Chinese mythology who saved the world from the heat of suns
 List of mythological objects
 Sun deity

Explanatory notes

Citations

References

Primary

Secondary
 
 
 
 

Artifacts in Norse mythology
Mythological shields